This is a list of the number-one songs of 2016 in Mexico. The airplay chart rankings are published by Monitor Latino, based on airplay across radio stations in Mexico using the Radio Tracking Data, LLC in real time. Charts are ranked from Monday to Sunday.

The streaming charts are published weekly by AMPROFON (Asociación Mexicana de Productores de Fonogramas y Videogramas).

Chart history (airplay) 
In 2016, nineteen songs reached number one on the General chart, the biggest amount since the chart started in 2007. Of these, fourteen songs were entirely or mostly in Spanish, and the remaining five were entirely in English (also the biggest amount since the chart was founded). Thirteen acts achieved their first number-one song in Mexico: Coldplay, Maluma, Twenty One Pilots, Joey Montana, Wisin, Justin Timberlake, Daddy Yankee, DJ Snake, Justin Bieber, Pharrell Williams, Bia, Sky and Los Plebes del Rancho.

"Safari" by J Balvin was the longest-running number-one of the year, staying at the top position for seven weeks. The best-performing song of the year was Joey Montana's "Picky".

Besides the General chart, Monitor Latino also publishes "Pop", "Popular" (Regional Mexican) and "Anglo" charts.

General

Pop

Popular

Anglo

Chart history (streaming)

See also
List of number-one albums of 2016 (Mexico)
List of Top 100 songs for 2016 in Mexico

References

2016
Number-one songs
Mexico